Remte is a Latvian village, located in Saldus Municipality, Remte Parish. Located in the middle of the parish on the shores of Remte Lake and P109 national road. 17.5 km from Municipality center Saldus and 107 km from nation capital Riga.  In Remte there is a parish administration, library, culture house, primary school, church, doctor's internist's practice, social care center "Atpūtas", post office, shop. Village has formed around the Remte Manor (Remten) center. After the Second World War, village grew around the Soviet Kolkhoz "Remte". The buildings of Remte Manor, the park and the Remte Lutheran Church are monuments of national significance.

References

Villages in Latvia
Saldus Municipality